Unseen Wonder (translit. Čudo neviđeno) is a 1984 Yugoslav comedy film directed by Živko Nikolić. It was entered into the 14th Moscow International Film Festival where it won the Silver Prize.

Cast
 Savina Geršak as Amerikanka
 Dragan Nikolić as Karuzo
 Boro Begović as Đoko
 Petar Božović as Zeljo
 Veljko Mandić as Zeljo's father
 Taško Načić as Baro
 Vesna Pećanac as Krstinja
 Boro Stjepanović as Soro
 Danilo 'Bata' Stojković as Gazda Šćepan
 Bata Živojinović as Father Makarije

References

External links
 

1984 films
1984 comedy films
Yugoslav comedy films
Serbian comedy films
Serbo-Croatian-language films
Films set in Yugoslavia
Films set in Montenegro